The Harborough by-election was a Parliamentary by-election held on 23 March 1916. Harborough returned one Member of Parliament (MP)  to the House of Commons of the United Kingdom, elected by the first past the post voting system. The by-election was due to the resignation of the Liberal MP, John William Logan.  It was won by the Liberal candidate Percy Harris.

Vacancy
John William Logan had been Liberal MP for the seat of Harborough since the December 1910 General Elections. His health was poor following a hunting accident. In 1910 he returned to House but by 1916 the strain proved too great, forcing him to retire permanently from public life.

Electoral history
Harborough had been won by a Liberal candidate at every election since its 1885 creation, apart from 1886 when the Conservative won. Logan had represented the division from 1891-1904 and again since December 1910.

Candidates
Logan's long-standing poor health had meant that the local Liberal Association were advanced in selecting his replacement. In anticipation of a 1915 General Election, they had already selected Percy Harris. Harris was a London County Councillor, who had stood twice for parliament elsewhere. He had no links with the constituency but his candidacy was officially endorsed by both the Unionist and Labour parties, due to the wartime electoral truce.

Campaign
The campaign took place against a national backdrop of a war that was not going well for Britain. The Coalition Government led by H. H. Asquith was being criticised by the Northcliffe Press. Its newspapers got behind the Independent candidate Tommy Bowles who campaigned on the issue of married men who had attested under the Derby Scheme. Advertising hoardings in the constituency were bought up by Northcliffe and carried slogans like "Buy the Daily Mail and vote for Bowles". A special pro-Bowles local edition of the Daily Mirror was produced and delivered free to homes in the constituency. Although the local Unionist association formally supported Harris, in line with the national all-party agreement, a number of local Unionists chose to support and actively campaign for Bowles.

Result
Despite the activities of the Northcliffe papers and local Unionists, the Liberals held the seat with an increased share of the vote.

Aftermath
In 1918, Harris's Unionist opponent was endorsed by the Coalition Government and gained the seat.

References

1910s in Leicestershire
1916 in England
1916 elections in the United Kingdom
By-elections to the Parliament of the United Kingdom in Leicestershire constituencies
March 1916 events